The Sovata is a right tributary of the river Târnava Mică in Romania. It discharges into the Târnava Mică in Sovata.

References

Rivers of Romania
Rivers of Mureș County